The discography of Danish rock band Mew consists of seven studio albums, three extended plays, one compilation album, and two live albums.

Albums

Studio albums

Extended plays

Compilation albums

Live albums

Singles

A  "She Came Home for Christmas" was re-released as a double A-side single with "That Time on the Ledge" in the UK in 2003.

References

Discographies of Danish artists